Austin Shepherd (born May 28, 1992) is a former American football offensive tackle. He played college football at University of Alabama. He was drafted by the Minnesota Vikings in the seventh round, 228th overall of the 2015 NFL draft. He has also played for the San Diego Chargers.

Early years
Shepherd attended North Gwinnett High School in Suwanee, Georgia, where he was teammates with Ja'Wuan James. In his sophomore season, North Gwinnett advanced to the GHSA Class 5A state championship game with 13–2 record, where they lost 34–6 to Valdosta Lowndes led by Greg Reid and Telvin Smith. As a junior, Shepherd helped North Gwinnett to a berth in state quarterfinals behind 10–3 finish, where they lost 20–3 to Alec Ogletree's Newnan. In Shepherd's senior season, North Gwinnett finished with a 13–1 mark, earning Region 7-5A championship while advancing to the state quarterfinals, where they lost 35–0 to Camden County.

He was ranked by Rivals.com as the No. 18 guard and No. 22 by Scout.com, while ESPN.com ranked him 46th nationally as an offensive tackle. He was also ranked 13th on Atlanta Journal-Constitution Georgia Top 50. Regarded as a three-star recruit by Rivals.com, Shepherd chose Alabama over Georgia Tech, Clemson, South Carolina and UAB. He enrolled in January 2010 and participated in spring drills for the Crimson Tide.

Professional career

Minnesota Vikings
Shepherd was selected by the Minnesota Vikings with the 228th pick in the 2015 NFL Draft. He was signed to a four-year, $2.34 million contract with a $69,694 signing bonus. He was released on August 29, 2016.

San Diego Chargers
On September 4, 2016, Shepherd was signed to the Chargers' practice squad. On September 20, 2016, he was released from the practice squad.

Pittsburgh Steelers
On October 11, 2016, Shepherd was signed to the Steelers' practice squad. He was released by the team on October 19, 2016.

Second stint with Vikings
On October 25, 2016, Shepherd was signed to the Vikings' practice squad. He signed a reserve/futures contract with the Vikings on January 2, 2017.

On September 2, 2017, Shepherd was waived by the Vikings.

References

External links
 
 Minnesota Vikings bio
 Alabama Crimson Tide bio

1992 births
Living people
People from Buford, Georgia
Sportspeople from the Atlanta metropolitan area
North Gwinnett High School alumni
Players of American football from Georgia (U.S. state)
American football offensive tackles
Alabama Crimson Tide football players
Minnesota Vikings players
San Diego Chargers players
Pittsburgh Steelers players